Penelope is a single released by indie rock band Pinback, on their album, Blue Screen Life. It is regarded as one of their most well-known songs. The two B-sides, "Anti-Hu" and "Seville" (Demo) can be found on Nautical Antiques.

The song was inspired by Armistead Burwell Smith IV's fish named Penelope, as can be seen on his Twitter page.

The song has been covered by several bands including Saosin and PlayRadioPlay!

Track listing
 "Penelope"
 "Anti-Hu"
 "Seville" (Demo)

2001 singles
Pinback songs